Yatra.com is an Indian online travel agency and travel search engine. It is based in Gurugram, Haryana. It was founded by Dhruv Shringi, Manish Amin and Sabina Chopra in August 2006.

History 

In April 2012, it became the second-largest online travel service in India, with a 30 percent share of the  market for online travel-related transactions. It launched “holiday-cum-shopping card” with State Bank of India (SBI).

In November 2013, Yatra.com launched e-gift cards in collaboration with Qwikcilver.

In January 2016, Yatra.com appointed Vikrant Mudaliar as a chief marketing officer. He previously served as chief sales and marketing officer at Lenskart.com. It was publicly listed on the NASDAQ under the ticker symbol YTRA in December of the same year.

In July 2019, Ebix, a US-based company, planned to acquire Yatra.com but the acquisition was cancelled in June 2020.

In June 2020, Yatra.com announced an underwritten public offering at $11.5 mn and laid off about 400 employees around the same time.

In June 2021, Yatra collaborated with Oyo Rooms, Airbnb, and EaseMyTrip to form the Confederation of Hospitality, Technology and Tourism Industry (CHATT), an industry body for the tourism sector of India.

Acquisitions 
Yatra.com made three acquisitions: ticket consolidator Travel Services International (TSI) in October 2010, global distribution system provider Magicdom and Indian events and entertainment portal BuzzInTown. All were acquired for undisclosed amounts. In July 2012, Yatra.com acquired a 100% stake in Travelguru. In 2016, Yatra.com   acquired-hired Mumbai-based Travel-logs.in, which specializes in customized city walks and private tours.

Investors
Early investors included Reliance Venture Asset Management Ltd, Web18 of TV18 Group (a subsidiary of Network 18), Norwest Venture Partners and Intel Capital.

References

External links

Companies based in Haryana
Indian companies established in 2006
Transport companies established in 2006
Internet properties established in 2006
Indian travel websites
Online travel agencies
Travel ticket search engines
2014 initial public offerings
Companies listed on the Nasdaq
2006 establishments in Haryana